Columbus Spurlock Ewing (July 14, 1902 – October 6, 1947) was an American Negro league outfielder in the 1930s.

A native of Nashville, Tennessee, Ewing played for the Louisville White Sox in 1931. In three recorded games, he posted three hits in ten plate appearances. Ewing died in St. Louis, Missouri in 1947 at age 45.

References

External links
Baseball statistics and player information from Baseball-Reference Black Baseball Stats and Seamheads

1902 births
1947 deaths
Louisville White Sox players
Baseball outfielders
Baseball players from Nashville, Tennessee
20th-century African-American sportspeople